Capo Colonne Lighthouse is situated on the extremity of the Promunturium Lacinium, nearby the single column of the Greek temple elevated in honour of Hera Lacinia, at  from Crotone on the Ionian Sea.

Description
In 2002 the lighthouse was restored and in 2012 modernized.

See also
 List of lighthouses in Italy

References

External links

 Servizio Fari Marina Militare 

Lighthouses in Italy
Lighthouses completed in 1873
Buildings and structures in the Province of Crotone